The Ukrainian Orthodox Church – Kyiv Patriarchate (UOC-KP;  (UPTs-KP)) is an unrecognized Orthodox church in Ukraine. It came into existence in 1992.

It merged into the Orthodox Church of Ukraine in 2018. In 2019, the former leader of the church Filaret (Denysenko) declared its "revival" following his conflict with Epiphanius, however, it was not supported by the majority of the bishops of former Kyiv Patriarchate.

After its unilateral declaration of autocephaly in 1992, the patriarchate was not recognised by the other Eastern Orthodox churches, and was considered a "schismatic group" by the Moscow Patriarchate. The Ecumenical Patriarchate decided on 11 October to reintegrate the faithful Christians of Ukraine into the Orthodox Church including the faithful and hierarchs of the UOC-KP and accord to the newly formed church autocephaly. The newly formed church was not recognised as a patriarchy.

St Volodymyr's Cathedral in Kyiv is the UOC-KP's patriarchal cathedral. The church's primate was Patriarch Filaret (Denysenko), who was enthroned in 1995. Filaret was excommunicated by the Russian Orthodox Church in 1997, an action not recognized by the UOC-KP synod.

After the 9–11 October 2018 synod of the Ecumenical Patriarchate of Constantinople, Filaret's appeal against the excommunication by the Moscow patriarchate was re-examined, he was reinstated as a bishop, and the Ecumenical Patriarchate decided it would grant autocephaly to a unified church in Ukraine. The Kyiv Patriarchate and the Ukrainian Autocephalous Orthodox Church accepted the proposal of the ecumenical patriarchate to dissolve and participate to a unification synod in Kiev. Thus they merged with other Moscow Patriarchate bishops into an independent (autocephalous) Ukrainian Orthodox Church, the Orthodox Church of Ukraine. The newly founded autocephalous church has been until now recognized by the ecumenical patriarchate of Constantinople, the autocephalous Church of Greece and the patriarchate of Alexandria, and not yet by other autocephalous churches; the Serbian and Polish have refused to recognise Constantinople's reunifixation Synod and the creation of the Orthodox Church of Ukraine. The patriarchate of Moscow had forbidden its clergy from celebrating with clergy of the ecumenical patriarchate.

On 15 December 2018, bishops and delegates from three major branches of Orthodoxy in Ukraine (the UOC-KP, the UAOC and some members of the UOC-MP) unified at a council. During the council, Metropolitan Epiphanius I (a former bishop of the Kyiv Patriarchate) was elected Metropolitan of Kyiv and All Ukraine and became the primate of the new Orthodox Church of Ukraine.

On 20 June 2019, a small number of Pro-Filaret UOC (former UOC-KP) members—including Filaret—left the OCU after a local UOC-KP council.

History

The Kyiv Patriarchate considers itself an independent church, a successor of the Metropolis of Kyiv and all Rus which existed under the Ecumenical Patriarchate until 1686 (when it was incorporated into the Moscow Patriarchate of the Russian Orthodox Church). In January 1992, after Ukraine became an independent state during the dissolution of the Soviet Union, Metropolitan of Kyiv Filaret convened an assembly at the Kyiv Pechersk Lavra which submitted a request for Ukrainian autocephaly to the Moscow Patriarch. The Moscow Patriarch did not comply.

The church was organised in June 1992. Its nominal primate was the émigré Mstyslav (Skrypnyk), primate of the Ukrainian Autocephalous Orthodox Church. Mstyslav never approved the union of the UAOC and UOC-KP. Although Metropolitan Filaret had been the driving force of the Kyiv Patriarchate, it was not until the sudden death of Patriarch Volodymyr (Romaniuk) in July 1995 that he was elected the Patriarch of Kyiv and All Rus-Ukraine in October of that year. Filaret had been defrocked by the Moscow Patriarchate (in which he had been ordained and served as bishop from February 1962 to spring 1992), and was excommunicated in February 1997.

After the 2014 Russian annexation of Crimea, 38 of the church's 46 parishes in Crimea ceased to exist; three churches were seized by Russian authorities. The Kyiv Patriarchate is unrecognised by the Moscow Patriarchate (which considers it schismatic) and other Orthodox churches. In April 2018, the Ecumenical Patriarchate began to consider a request by the Ukrainian Parliament to grant canonical status to the UOC-KP in Ukraine.

11 October 2018 Ecumenical Patriarchate decision 

In early September 2018, Ecumenical Patriarch of Constantinople Bartholomew indicated that the Church of Constantinople did not recognise the Moscow Patriarchate's claim to ecclesiastical jurisdiction over "the region of today's Metropolis of Kyiv". On 11 October 2018, after a synod, the Patriarchate of Constantinople renewed an earlier decision to move towards granting autocephaly to the Ukrainian Orthodox Church. The synod also withdrew Constantinople's 332-year qualified acceptance of the Russian Orthodox Church's jurisdiction over the Ukrainian Church, contained in a 1686 letter. It lifted the excommunications of Patriarch Filaret of the Ukrainian Orthodox Church – Kyiv Patriarchate (UOC-KP) and Metropolitan Makariy of the Ukrainian Autocephalous Orthodox Church (UAOC); both bishops were "canonically reinstated to their hierarchical or priestly rank, and their faithful ... restored to communion with the Church."

The following day, the UOC-KP declared that the decision restored the canonical recognition of the episcopate and clergy of the Kyiv Patriarchate. It was later clarified that the Ecumenical Patriarchate considered Filaret "the former metropolitan of Kyiv" and Makariy "the former Archbishop of Lviv" and, on 2 November 2018, the Ecumenical Patriarchate did not recognise the UAOC or the UOC-KP and their leaders. The Ecumenical Patriarchate declared that it recognised sacraments performed by the UOC-KP and the UAOC as valid.

On 20 October 2018, the UOC-KP changed the title of its leader to "His Holiness and Beatitude (name), Archbishop and Metropolitan of Kyiv – Mother of the Rus Cities and of Galicia, Patriarch of All Rus-Ukraine, Holy Archimandrite of the Holy Assumption Kyiv-Pechersk and Pochayiv Lavra". The abridged form is "His Holiness (name), Patriarch of Kyiv and All Rus’-Ukraine", and the form for interchurch relations is "Archbishop, Metropolitan of Kyiv and All Rus'-Ukraine". The full title and the interchurch-relations version's mention of "archbishop" and "metropolitan" and the abridged form's mention of "patriarch" have caused confusion.

Dissolution and merger with the UAOC into the OCU 

On 15 December 2018, the Ukrainian Autocephalous Orthodox Church and UOC-KP hierarchies decided to dissolve the churches. That day, the UAOC, the UOC–KP and some members of the Ukrainian Orthodox Church (Moscow Patriarchate) were going to merge to form the Orthodox Church of Ukraine after a unification council.

According to Filaret, "the Kyiv Patriarchate has not been liquidated. It is not liquidated. They want to present the situation as if it was liquidated. The Kyiv Patriarchate can be liquidated by the one who created it". The Ukrainian Ministry of Culture, "in response to a widely circulated statement by the media, alleging that the Ukrainian Orthodox Church of the Kyivan Patriarchate still exists or is being restored in Ukraine", published a report that the UOC-KP had "actually and legally ceased its activities". Filaret said, "The Ukrainian Orthodox Church of the Kyiv Patriarchate (UOC-KP) remains registered with state bodies. In particular, the Kyiv Patriarchate remains registered. This means the Kyiv Patriarchate continues to legally exist." According to the Ukrainian Ministry of Justice, the UOC-KP still existed.

Separation from the OCU and reestablishment of the UOC–KP 
The local council of the UOC-KP (convened by Filaret) decided to cancel the decisions of the unification council of the Orthodox churches of Ukraine on 20 June 2019, during the conflict between Filaret and Epiphanius.

On 31 July 2019, the Ukrainian Ministry of Culture said the UOC-KP had ceased to exist. However, on 4 September 2019, the  suspended the liquidation of the UOC-KP at the request of the UOC-KP. On 11 September, another decision of the same court blocked "the Justice Ministry of Ukraine, the Culture Ministry of Ukraine, its structural sub-units, central-government and local authorities, and notaries public from performing any registration regarding the Kyiv Patriarchate, the Ukrainian Orthodox Church of the Kyiv Patriarchate [UOC-KP], and their assets" On 11 November 2019, the Court of Appeal of the District Administrative Court of Kyiv confirmed legality of the process of liquidation of the UOC-KP.

On 14 December 2019, after the meeting of the enlarged Bishops' Council, held on 14 December in Kyiv on the occasion of the anniversary of the creation of the OCU, Epiphanius declared that the procedure of liquidation of the UAOC as well as the UOC-KP had been completed the day before. He added: "Such structures no longer exist. In confirmation of that, in the State Register there is marked 'activity DISCONTINUED. In the same month, the UOC-KP stated it did not recognize the liquidation.

In January 2020, the UOC-KP announced that Filaret had officially withdrawn his signature from 15 December 2018 act of dissolution of the UOC-KP.

Statistics
The Kyiv Patriarchate had 44 percent of Orthodox Christians, compared to 12.8 percent for the UOC of the Moscow Patriarchate. Although the Russian Orthodox Church in Ukraine (UOC-MP) has twice as many parishes, the UOC-KP had three times as many members. The former had 38 percent of all Orthodox and 25 percent of the population in 2016, and the Russian Orthodox had 23 percent of the Orthodox and 15 percent of the population. The UOC-KP had 34 dioceses worldwide, and over 5,100 parishes in Ukraine. Its United States vicariate consisted of 15 parishes, with its main cathedral St. Andrew's in Bloomingdale, Illinois. The church had six parishes in Australia, and over 40 in western Europe. The Russian government's reported negative influence on the Moscow Patriarchate and claims that it is using the patriarchate as a "tool of influence over Ukraine" led to a renewed April 2018 drive to recognise an independent Ukrainian Orthodox church which, according to Ukrainian President Petro Poroshenko, would help "eliminate internal strife and conflicts within the state."

UOC-KP adherents in Ukraine, excluding Crimea and breakaway areas of Donbas:

Primates

After being dismissed in 1992 by the Archhierarch Synod of the Ukrainian Orthodox Church, Ukrainian Metropolitan Filaret created the Ukrainian Orthodox Church – Kyiv Patriarchate (UOC–KP) under Patriarch Mstyslav of the Ukrainian Autocephalous Orthodox Church (UAOC). Mstyslav never approved of the union of the UAOC and the UOC-KP.

Patriarch Mstyslav (Stepan Ivanovych Skrypnyk) was Patriarch of Kyiv and all Rus’-Ukraine and primate of the Ukrainian Autocephalous Orthodox Church (UAOC) and Ukrainian Orthodox Church – Kyiv Patriarchate (UOC–KP) from 1991 to 1993. After Mstyslav's death in 1993, the temporary union ended and the Ukrainian Orthodox Church – Kyiv Patriarchate and the Ukrainian Autocephalous Orthodox Church separated. The primates of the Ukrainian Orthodox Church–Kyiv Patriarchate continued to hold the title of patriarch:
 Patriarch Volodymyr (Volodomyr Romaniuk) (1993–1995)
 Patriarch Filaret (Filaret Denysenko), (1995–present)

On 20 October 2018, the UOC-KP changed the title of its primate to "His Holiness and Beatitude (name), Archbishop and Metropolitan of Kyiv – Mother of the Rus Cities and of Galicia, Patriarch of All Rus-Ukraine, Holy Archimandrite of the Holy Assumption Kyiv-Pechersk and Pochayiv Lavra". The abridged form is "His Holiness (name), Patriarch of Kyiv and All Russia-Ukraine", and the form for inter-church relations is "Archbishop, Metropolitan of Kyiv and All Rus'-Ukraine". Metropolitan Hilarion called the bestowal of title a "farce".

Administration

Before the first disestablishment:

Dioceses 

 Belgorod
 Bogorodsk
 Cherkasy
 Chernihiv
 Chernivtsi
 Crimea
 Dnipropetrovsk
 Donetsk
 Drohobych-Sambir
 Ivano-Frankivsk
 Kharkiv
 Kherson
 Khmelnytsky
 Kitsman
 Kolomyia
 Kropyvnytskyi
 Kyiv
 Luhansk
 Lviv
 Mykolayiv
 Odessa
 Pereiaslav
 Poltava
 Rivne
 Sumy
 Ternopil-Buchach
 Ternopil-Terebovlya
 Vinnytsia
 Volyn
 Volodymyr-Volynskyi
 Zakarpattia Oblast
 Zaporizhzhya
 Zhytomyr
 Deanery of Germany
 Eastern Moldavia
 Paris

Exarchates and vicariates
 Exarchate in Greece
 Ukrainian Orthodox Vicarate of the UOC-KP in the US and Canada
 Vicariate in Australia
 European Exarchate
 Russian Exarchate

See also
 Bulgarian Alternative Synod
 Eastern Orthodox Church organization
 Montenegrin Orthodox Church
 Orthodox Church in America
 Orthodox Church in Italy

References

External links
 
 
 Canonical status of the Ukrainian Orthodox Church – Kyiv Patriarchate
Decision of the UOC-KP to dissolve itself (in Ukrainian)

Further reading

External links

Eastern Orthodox Church bodies in Europe
Independent Eastern Orthodox denominations
1992 establishments in Ukraine
2018 disestablishments in Ukraine
Christian organizations established in 1992
Religious organizations disestablished in 2018
Christian organizations established in 2019